Roberta Vinci was the defending champion, but lost to Camila Giorgi in the second round.

Alizé Cornet won the tournament, defeating Giorgi in the final, 7–6(7–3), 5–7, 7–5, despite being a match point down in the third set.

Seeds 

 Agnieszka Radwańska (semifinals)
 Roberta Vinci (second round)
 Carla Suárez Navarro (semifinals)
 Alizé Cornet (champion)
 Klára Koukalová (quarterfinals)
 Yvonne Meusburger (quarterfinals)
 Magdaléna Rybáriková (quarterfinals)
 Tsvetana Pironkova (second round)

Main draw

Finals

Top half

Bottom half

Qualifying

Seeds 

  Claire Feuerstein (qualified)
  Nastassja Burnett (first round)
  Vera Dushevina (qualified)
  Sofia Arvidsson (second round)
  Kristína Kučová (qualified)
  Stephanie Vogt (first round)
  Arantxa Rus (second round)
  Aleksandra Krunić (qualifying competition)

Qualifiers 

  Claire Feuerstein
  Kristína Kučová
  Vera Dushevina
  Ksenia Pervak

Qualifying draw

First qualifier

Second qualifier

Third qualifier

Fourth qualifier

References 
 Main draw
 Qualifying draw

BNP Paribas Katowice Open - Singles
2014 Singles